Pawai is a town in Vidisha district, Madhya Pradesh, India.

Cities and towns in Vidisha district